Gary O'Shaughnessy represented Ireland in the 2001 Eurovision Song Contest in Copenhagen with the song "Without Your Love".

Before Eurovision

Eurosong 2001 
Eurosong 2001 was the national final format developed by RTÉ in order to select Ireland's entry for the Eurovision Song Contest 2001. The competition was held at the RTÉ Television Centre in Dublin on 25 February 2001 and hosted by Louise Loughman. Eight artists and songs were initially selected to compete, with regional televoting determining the winner. However, the number of participants was reduced to seven when "Gypsy Blue", written and to have been performed by Thom Moore, was disqualified for having been released before Eurosong, violating the rule that barred songs from being released before the contest. After the combination of votes, "Without Your Love" performed by Gary O'Shaughnessy was selected as the winner, despite only received the third highest number of overall votes with 11,653 votes. InFocus received the most overall votes with 13,356, while Fe-Mail received 12,271.

At Eurovision 
For the 2002 contest, the EBU abandoned the qualifying scheme it had used since 1997, in which countries were allowed to participate based on their average scores from the previous five years. Instead, only the thirteen highest scoring countries were invited to compete in Tallinn, along with the "Big Four" and the countries relegated from the 2001 contest.

O'Shaughnessy performed 12th in the running order on the night of the contest. "Without Your Love" went on to place 21st with 6 points, and was Ireland worst result in the contest at the time. Under the five-year averages method, Ireland would have qualified for the 2002 contest, but the 21st-place ranking was not good enough under the new qualifying method. As a result of relegation, however, Ireland was given a guaranteed spot in the 2003 contest.

Voting

References

2001
Countries in the Eurovision Song Contest 2001
Eurovision
Eurovision